Janet Kathleen Davies (14 September 1927 – 22 September 1986) was an English actress best known for her recurring role as Mrs. Pike in the long-running sitcom Dad's Army.

Although mainly remembered for her role in Dad's Army, appearing in 30 episodes of the series, she also featured in many other television and film roles including Dixon of Dock Green, The Fall and Rise of Reginald Perrin, All Creatures Great and Small, Last of the Summer Wine, Z-Cars, The Citadel, Pride and Prejudice, Open All Hours, Are You Being Served?, and in the films The Ghost Goes Gear (1966) and Interlude (1968).

When she was not acting, Davies exploited her typing and shorthand training by working with various theatrical agencies. She was married to the actor Ian Gardiner, who was best known for having played Reginald Molehusband in a Central Office of Information public information film in the 1960s.

She died on 22 September 1986, aged 59, from breast cancer which had metastasised to her lungs.

Early life
Davies was born in Wakefield, West Riding of Yorkshire. Her father, a solicitor, died in his early thirties, and as a result she was sent to boarding school. She began training as a solicitor but left and qualified as a shorthand typist instead. She worked as a BBC secretary for two years, assigned to programmes including Dick Barton before eventually moving into repertory in 1948, appearing at Leatherhead, Watford, Shrewsbury, Bedford and Northampton.

Dad's Army
Davies was a client of the theatrical agent, Ann Callender, and also worked as a secretary for Callender whenever she was short of work. Callender was the wife of TV producer David Croft, the director, co-writer and producer of Dad's Army. Croft said that Davies "hastened to suggest herself for the part. After all, being in the office where the script first saw the light of day, she knew the requirements well." Davies went to see Croft in order to read for the part. Croft recalled that "She seemed to be just the right age and type to play the role."

Davies played the doting mother of Private Frank Pike (Ian Lavender), Mrs Pike, in 30 episodes of the sitcom, with her story lines mainly involving her relationship with Sergeant Wilson (John Le Mesurier) and her 'mollycoddling' of her son, much to the annoyance of Captain George Mainwaring (Arthur Lowe). Her first appearance is in the first episode, The Man and the Hour, and her last is in the final episode, Never Too Old.

For the film version of Dad's Army (1971), Liz Fraser was cast as Mrs Pike. This decision was made by the director, Norman Cohen, who wanted a less 'homely' actress for the role. The recasting was very controversial and one of the changes imposed by backers Columbia Pictures that added to the unhappiness of the cast. Co-writer of the television series, Jimmy Perry, has said "It was a mistake...not to cast Janet in the role because the viewing public has come to recognise her as Mrs. Pike. But that was a decision made by Columbia".

Illness and death
Davies died on 22 September 1986 from breast cancer, which had metastasized to her lungs. Her Dad's Army co-star Bill Pertwee said that she "spent her last days in a hospice and died peacefully" adding that she was a "lovely woman".

Television

Filmography

References

External links
 

1927 births
1986 deaths
English film actresses
English television actresses
Actresses from Yorkshire
Actors from Wakefield
Deaths from breast cancer
Deaths from cancer in England
20th-century English actresses